Oomine may refer to:

Mount Ōmine, a mountain in Japan
11152 Oomine, a minor planet named after the mountain